The 2022 Supercoppa Italiana (branded as the 2022 Supercoppa Italiana Ferrovie dello Stato Italiane for sponsorship reasons) was the 26rd edition of the Supercoppa Italiana. It was contested by Juventus, the 2021–22 Serie A and 2021–22 Coppa Italia champions and Roma, the runners-up of the two competitions.

The match was played in Parma at Stadio Ennio Tardini on 5 November 2022 and Roma won their first title. This edition was then first, since 2019's edition played between only two teams.

Match

Broadcasting 
Italian broadcasters La7 and La7d has secured linear and digital rights to domestic women’s club football competitions for the 2021–22
and 2022–23 seasons as part of an extended rights deal with the Italian Football Federation, which includes Supercoppa Italiana.

References 

Football in Italy
Sport in Italy
Football competitions in Italy
2021–22 in Italian women's football
Supercoppa Italiana (women)
Juventus F.C. (women) matches